Pórticos de San Antonio, or San Antonio Heights, is a fraccionamiento in Baja California in Tijuana Municipality. The city had a population of 34,234 as of 2010.

See also

References

External links

Populated places in Tijuana Municipality